Line D is a Under construction line of the Prague Metro, which will serve Prague 4 and Prague 12 in the south of the Czech capital. Construction began on the first part of the line in 2022.

History
Construction of Line D connecting Náměstí Míru with Nové Dvory area was previously intended to start in 2010. An alternative was proposed in 2012, without building a transfer station at Pankrác, and instead sharing Line C between Nádraží Holešovice and Pankrác. 
The construction of the line was approved by the city of Prague in 2013, and was initially planned to be built between 2017 and 2022. The project involves  of track with 10 stations, connecting Náměstí Míru and Depo Písnice. The cost was initially estimated at least at 25 billion CZK, in 2018 the cost increased to 43 billion CZK and in 2020 to 73 billion CZK. In July 2015, it was decided that the line will be driverless. 

Construction work on the Pankrác – Olbrachtova section began in 2021 and is planned to finish in 2023. Completion of Pankrác – Písnice is planned for 2029. In addition to the phase from Pankrác to Písnice, second phase of Line D will also lead from Pankrác to Náměstí Míru.

Stations

 Pankrác (transfer to Line C)
 Olbrachtova
 Nádraží Krč (Praha-Krč railway station)
 Nemocnice Krč (Thomayer hospital)
 Nové Dvory

References

External links
 (Under "reconstruction", as of November 28, 2017.) 

Prague Metro
2023 in rail transport
2029 in rail transport